Adebowale Ogungbure (born 13 July 1981) is a Nigerian former professional footballer who played as a midfielder. He previously played for one season in the Bundesliga with 1. FC Nürnberg.

On 25 March 2006, in a match between FC Sachsen Leipzig and Hallescher FC, Ogungbure was the subject of monkey noises from Hallescher FC Fans. In retaliation he placed two fingers above his mouth and saluted at the crowd – a reference to Adolf Hitler. First, Ogungbure was accused and reported by German police, as it is illegal to make Nazi gestures for political or abusive purposes, but criminal proceedings were dropped 24 hours later.

The team and especially a group of the supporters of FC Sachsen came up with a campaign to show their solidarity with Ogungbure. The fans' campaign "Wir sind Ade" (We are Ade-bowale) managed to raise attention for Ogungbure's situation and against racism in Germany. The initiative still exists as "Bunte Kurve" (colourful fan stand).

References

External links
 
 

Living people
1981 births
Yoruba sportspeople
Sportspeople from Lagos
Association football midfielders
Nigerian expatriate footballers
Expatriate footballers in Germany
Nigerian footballers
NEPA Lagos players
1. FC Nürnberg players
Expatriate footballers in Vietnam
V.League 1 players
SSV Reutlingen 05 players
FC Energie Cottbus players
FC Sachsen Leipzig players
Kickers Offenbach players
Bundesliga players
2. Bundesliga players